The following is a list of highest men's association football payments of Iran, which details the highest transfer fees paid for players from Iran or fees paid by Iranian clubs, as well as the largest contracts signed ever.

Highest transfer payments for Iranian players in Europe

Highest transfer payments received by Iranian clubs

Highest transfer payments paid by Iranian clubs

Largest contracts signed involving Iranian players 
This is a list of highest salaried Iranian football players, whether they were transferred, signed as free agent or extended their contracts. It does not include undisclosed contracts. This list also does not necessarily reflect actual money collected by the players, since some contracts are eventually terminated due to different reasons. The contract figures referenced below are presented at face value and do not reflect potential pre or post-tax treatments.

Largest buyout clauses set for Iranian players 
This is a list of largest reported buyout clauses set for Iranian players whether they were triggered or not:

References

Payment
Iran
Highest payments
Iranian football
Football
Association football player non-biographical articles